Novy Suyush (Yañı Söyöş) is a rural locality (a village) in Kashkinsky Selsoviet, Askinsky District, Bashkortostan, Russia. The population was 127 as of 2010. There are 6 streets.

Geography 
Novy Suyush is located 39 km southeast of Askino (the district's administrative centre) by road. Kashkino is the nearest rural locality.

References 

Rural localities in Askinsky District